

Background
The death of Andhra Pradesh Industries Minister Mekapati Goutham Reddy on 21 February 2022 warranted the assembly by election to his Atmakur constituency. The Election Commission of India released the by poll schedule on 25 May 2022 along with 6 other assembly and 3 parliamentary constituencies.

Schedule
The gazette notification was released with schedule for the election on 30 May 2022.

Candidates
YSRCP decided to field Gowtham Reddy's brother Mekapati Vikram Reddy as candidate. BJP fielded Gundlapalli Bharat Kumar as their candidate. A total of 15 candidates are contesting the election after Returning Officer rejected 13 nominations.

Results

Counting was held on 26 June and results were declared on the same day. Mekapati Vikram Reddy of YSRCP won by a maj0irty of 82,888 votes.

References

2022 elections in India
By-elections in India
Elections in Andhra Pradesh
2020s in Andhra Pradesh
May 2022 events in India